Clifford Iyobosa Omoruyi (born 11 October 2001) is a Nigerian college basketball player for the Rutgers Scarlet Knights of the Big Ten Conference.

Early life and high school career
Omoruyi grew up in Benin City, Nigeria and played soccer. Due to standing 6'8, he received attention from basketball scouts who stated he could earn a scholarship overseas. At the age of 14, Omoruyi moved to the United States to attend Queen of Peace High School in North Arlington, New Jersey. Muhammad Oliver, a friend of Omoruyi's brother Aldred, and his wife offered to serve as his host family. Omoruyi also began playing basketball shortly after his arrival, initially against Oliver's son and then in AAU events. As a freshman at Queen of Peace, he nearly averaged a double-double in four games before breaking his leg. Omoruyi returned in time for the state tournament and posted 22 points, 10 rebounds and five blocks in a game. Due to Queen of Peace shutting down, Omoruyi was forced to transfer to Roselle Catholic High School, and initially struggled with his grades. He transferred to Immaculate Conception High School for the second semester of his sophomore season to focus on academics, playing 10 games.

Omoruyi transferred back to Roselle Catholic High School going into his junior season, stating he did not wish to run from challenges. He averaged 11.6 points, 7.1 rebounds and 2.8 blocks per game as a junior. As a senior, Omoruyi averaged 14.2 points, 11.5 rebounds and 5.4 blocks per game, helping Roselle Catholic post a 22–7 record and win the NJSIAA's Non-Public B North title. Omoruyi was named the Gatorade New Jersey Player of the Year, First Team All-State by NJHoops.com and Second Team All-State by The Star-Ledger. On the Nike Elite Youth Basketball League circuit, he averaged 11.8 points, 6.7 rebounds and 1.5 blocks per game for the New York Lightning. He was considered to be a four-star prospect ranked 42nd in his class by Rivals. On 29 March 2020, Omoruyi committed to playing college basketball for Rutgers over offers from Arizona State and Auburn. He became the highest-rated recruit to select the Scarlet Knights since Kadeem Jack in 2010.

College career
Omoruyi suffered a knee sprain six games into his freshman season, forcing him to miss three weeks. As a freshman, he averaged 3.8 points and four rebounds per game. Omoruyi became the team's starting center going into his sophomore season due to Myles Johnson's transfer to UCLA. In his sophomore season debut, he scored 16 points and had nine rebounds against Lehigh, and subsequently enjoyed a breakout season. Omoruyi was named Honorable Mention All-Big Ten by the media as a sophomore. He averaged 11.9 points and 7.8 rebounds per game.

National team career
Omoruyi was invited to the training camp of the Nigeria men's national basketball team in preparation for the 2020 Summer Olympics.

Career statistics

College

|-
| style="text-align:left;"| 2020–21
| style="text-align:left;"| Rutgers
| 23 || 6 || 14.9 || .632 || .500 || .424 || 4.0 || .2 || .4 || .7 || 3.8

References

External links
Rutgers Scarlet Knights bio

2001 births
Living people
Nigerian men's basketball players
Nigerian expatriate basketball people in the United States
Centers (basketball)
Roselle Catholic High School alumni
Rutgers Scarlet Knights men's basketball players
Sportspeople from Benin City